Magdeburg-Herrenkrug station is a railway station in the Herrenkrug district of Magdeburg, capital city of Saxony-Anhalt, Germany.

History

The station was established in 1999 due to the Bundesgartenschau, which took place in the nearby Elbauenpark.

References

Herrenkrug
Railway stations in Germany opened in 1999